William Raymond "Ray" Cale (18 July 1922 – 23 May 2006) was a Welsh dual-code international rugby union, and professional rugby league footballer who played in the 1940s and 1950s.

Background
Ray Cale's birth was registered in Pontypool, Wales, he was a native of Usk in Monmouthshire, and he died aged 83.

Rugby union
Ray Cale made his name as a rampaging, tough tackling flanker. He learnt rugby union at Ebbw Vale and Newbridge. In 1947, he played for a combined Pontypool, Blaenavon and Talywain side against the Australian national rugby union team.

Cale made his Welsh début against England at Cardiff Arms Park in 1949 as a backrower. He played three Five Nations matches in the 1949 season. Wales came last in the championship.

In 1950, he switched to Pontypool RFC. Cale played in all four Five Nations matches the following season when Wales won a grand slam defeating England, Scotland, Ireland and France. He was known for his strong tackling and robust play. He scored a try against England at Twickenham, and forced an error that led to Malcolm Thomas scoring a match winning try against Ireland.

He was a controversial omission from the British and Irish Lions team that toured Australia and New Zealand later that season. He was deemed to be "too rough" a player for the tour.

Rugby league
He joined St. Helens the following season. His strong defensive game and robust running style allowed him to adapt easily to rugby league. In 1951, he played against the touring New Zealand national rugby league team for St Helens. He was a losing finalist in the 1952 Lancashire County Cup match against Leigh but was an integral member of championship winning side in the 1952/53 season. In 1953, he played for St Helens in the Rugby League Challenge Cup losing to the Huddersfield Giants 15-10 at Wembley Stadium

He played 122 games for St. Helens. He also became a double international by adding four Welsh league caps to the seven he won at union, figuring twice against Other Nationalities, France and England. His career in rugby league ended in 1953-54.

Challenge Cup Final appearances
Ray Cale played  in St. Helens' 10-15 defeat by Huddersfield in the 1953 Challenge Cup Final during the 1952-53 season at Wembley Stadium, London on Saturday 25 April 1953.

County Cup Final appearances
Ray Cale played  in St. Helens' 5-22 defeat by Leigh in the 1952 Lancashire County Cup Final during the 1952–53 season at Station Road, Swinton on Saturday 29 November 1952.

References

External links
Profile at Saints Heritage Society

1922 births
2006 deaths
Dual-code rugby internationals
Ebbw Vale RFC players
Newbridge RFC players
People from Usk
Pontypool RFC players
Rugby league locks
Rugby league players from Monmouthshire
Rugby league second-rows
Rugby union flankers
Rugby union players from Monmouthshire
St Helens R.F.C. players
Wales international rugby union players
Wales national rugby league team players
Welsh rugby league players
Welsh rugby union players